Carry On at Your Convenience is a 1971 British comedy film, the 22nd release in the series of 31 Carry On films (1958–1992), and was the first box office failure of the series. This failure has been attributed to the film's attempt at exploring the political themes of the trade union movement, crucially portraying the union activists as idle, pedantic buffoons which, apparently, alienated the traditional working-class audience of the series. The film, known as Carry On Round the Bend outside the United Kingdom, did not return full production costs until 1976 after several international and television sales.  The film features regulars Sid James, Kenneth Williams, Charles Hawtrey, Joan Sims, Hattie Jacques and Bernard Bresslaw. It features Kenneth Cope in the first of his two Carry on appearances.

Plot
In bathroom ceramics factory W.C. Boggs & Son, the traditionalist owner W.C. Boggs (Kenneth Williams) is having no end of trouble. Bolshy and lazy union representative Vic Spanner (Kenneth Cope) continually stirs up trouble in the works, to the irritation of his co-workers and management. He calls a strike for almost any minor incident – or because he wants time off to attend a local football match. Sid Plummer (Sid James) is the site foreman bridging the gap between workers and management, shrewdly keeping the place going amid the unrest.

Prissy floral-shirt-wearing product designer Charles Coote (Charles Hawtrey) has included a bidet in his latest range of designs, but W.C. objects to the manufacture of such "dubious" items. W.C. will not change his stance even after his son, Lewis Boggs (Richard O'Callaghan), secures a large overseas order for the bidets. It is a deal that could save the struggling firm, which W.C. has to admit is in debt to the banks.

Vic's dim stooge Bernie Hulke (Bernard Bresslaw) provides bumbling assistance in both his union machinations and his attempts to woo Sid's daughter, factory canteen worker Myrtle (Jacki Piper). She is torn between Vic and Lewis Boggs, who is something of a playboy but insists he loves her.

Sid's wife is Beattie (Hattie Jacques), a lazy housewife who does little but fuss over her pet budgie, Joey, which refuses to talk despite her concerted efforts. Their neighbour is Sid's brassy and lascivious co-worker Chloe Moore (Joan Sims). Chloe contends with the endless strikes and with her crude, travelling salesman husband Fred (Bill Maynard), who neglects her and leaves her dissatisfied. Chloe and Sid enjoy a flirtatious relationship and are sorely tempted to stray. Unusually for Sid James, his character is a faithful husband, albeit a cheeky and borderline-lecherous one.

Sid and Beattie find that Joey can correctly predict winners of horseraces – he tweets when the horse's name is read out. Sid bets on Joey's tips and makes several large wins – including a vital £1,000 loaned to W.C. when the banks refuse a bridging loan – before Sid is barred by Benny (Davy Kaye) his bookie after making several payouts.

The strikers finally return to work, but it is only to attend the annual works outing, a coach trip to Brighton. A good time is had by all with barriers coming down between workers and management, thanks largely to that great social lubricant, alcohol. W.C. becomes intoxicated and spends the day – and it seems the night – with his faithful, adoring secretary, Miss Hortense Withering (Patsy Rowlands). Lewis Boggs manages to win Myrtle from Vic Spanner, giving his rival a beating, and the couple elope. After arriving home late after the outing and with Fred away, Chloe invites Sid in for a cup of tea. They fight their desires and ultimately decide not to have the tea fearing that neighbours might see Sid enter Chloe's home and get the wrong idea.

At the picket lines the next day, Vic gets his comeuppance – partly at the hands of his mother (Renée Houston), who spanks him in public – and the workers and management all pull together to produce the big order to save the firm.

Cast
Sid James as Sid Plummer
Kenneth Williams as WC Boggs
Charles Hawtrey as Charles Coote
Hattie Jacques as Beattie Plummer
Joan Sims as Chloe Moore
Bernard Bresslaw as Bernie Hulke
Kenneth Cope as Vic Spanner
Jacki Piper as Myrtle Plummer
Richard O'Callaghan as Lewis Boggs
Patsy Rowlands as Hortense Withering
Davy Kaye as Benny
Bill Maynard as Fred Moore
Renée Houston as Agatha Spanner
Marianne Stone as Maud
Margaret Nolan as Popsy
Geoffrey Hughes as Willie
Hugh Futcher as Ernie
Simon Cain as Barman
Amelia Bayntun as Mrs Spragg
Leon Greene as Chef
Harry Towb as Film doctor
Shirley Stelfox as Bunny waitress
Peter Burton as Hotel manager
Julian Holloway as Roger
Anouska Hempel as New canteen girl

Crew
Screenplay – Talbot Rothwell
Music – Eric Rogers
Production Manager – Jack Swinburne
Art Director – Lionel Couch
Editor – Alfred Roome
Director of Photography – Ernest Steward
Camera Operator – James Bawden
Make-up – Geoffrey Rodway
Continuity – Rita Davidson
Assistant Director – David Bracknell
Sound Recordists – Danny Daniel & Ken Barker
Hairdresser – Stella Rivers
Costume Designer – Courtenay Elliott
Set Dresser – Peter Howitt
Assistant Art Director – William Alexander
Dubbing Editor – Brian Holland
Titles – GSE Ltd
Processor – Rank Film Laboratories
Toilets – Royal Doulton Sanitary Potteries
Assistant Editor – Jack Gardner
Producer – Peter Rogers
Director – Gerald Thomas

Filming and locations

Filming dates – 22 March-7 May 1971

Interiors:
 Pinewood Studios, Buckinghamshire

Exteriors:
 Brighton Palace Pier. The West Pier in Brighton was used two years later for Carry On Girls
 Brighton – Clarges Hotel. The same location was also used in the later Carry On Girls
 Pinewood Studios. The studio's wood storage area was used as the exterior of WC Boggs' factory
 Pinewood Green, Pinewood Estate. Sid Plummer's house and the Moores' house
 The Red Lion, Shreding Green, Buckinghamshire
 Kings Head, Albourne, West Sussex
 Cricketers Inn
 Royal Naval Arms
 The Seagull
 The Trout Inn
 The Man In Space
 Odeon Cinema, Uxbridge, Middlesex (demolished in September 1984)
 Heatherden Hall, Pinewood Studios
 Black Park Country Park, Iver Heath, Buckinghamshire

Production notes
After Sid James's character was criticised for leering at some girls in Carry On Henry (1971), here his character was changed to the put-upon family man similar to the character he portrayed in the TV sitcom Bless This House. In the next film Carry On Matron (1972) his character was preoccupied with thieving, but made odd suggestive comments to nurses (including one played by Jacki Piper, who played his daughter in this film). Sid's girl-chasing persona was fully reinstated for subsequent films.

See also
Prague Philharmonic, Gavin Sutherland conducting. The carry on album: music from the films : London, England : ASV, p1999. LCCN 00300982

References

Bibliography

External links

Carry On At Your Convenience at The Whippit Inn
Carry On at Your Convenience at BFI Screenonline

1971 films
At Your Convenience
Films set in Brighton
Films set in factories
Films directed by Gerald Thomas
1971 comedy films
Films shot at Pinewood Studios
Films produced by Peter Rogers
Films with screenplays by Talbot Rothwell
1970s English-language films
1970s British films